William Blumberg and Max Schnur were the defending champions but only Blumberg chose to defend his title, partnering Luke Saville. Blumberg lost in the first round to Juan Pablo Ficovich and Facundo Mena.

Nathaniel Lammons and Jackson Withrow won the title after defeating Treat Huey and John-Patrick Smith 7–5, 2–6, [10–5] in the final.

Seeds

Draw

References

External links
 Main draw

Cary Challenger - Doubles
2022 Doubles